The Pan American Women's 4x4 Wheelchair Handball Championship is the official competition for senior national Wheelchair handball teams of Pan America.

Tournaments

Medal count

References

Women's 4x4
Parasports competitions
Wheelchair handball
Recurring sporting events established in 2014
2014 establishments in South America